Elisa Lerner Nagler (Valencia, 6 June 1932), is a Venezuelan playwright and essayist. Among her works are the plays: Vida con mamá and En el vasto silencio de Manhattan; the essays volume Yo amo a Columbo o la pasión dispersa and the chronicle books: Carriel para la fiesta and Crónicas ginecológicas. In 1999 was awarded with the National Prize for Literature.

Bibliography
 En el vasto silencio de Manhattan (1961, play)
 Una sonrisa detrás de la metáfora (1969, essay)
 Vida con mamá (1976, play)
 Yo amo a Columbo (1979, essays)
 Carriel número cinco (1983, chronicles).
 Crónicas ginecológicas (1984, chronicles).
 Carriel para la fiesta (1997, chronicles)
 En el entretanto (2000, tales)
 Homenaje a la estrella (2002, tales)
 De muerte lenta (2006, novel)
 Así que pasen cien años (2016, collected chronicles)

References
Socorro, Milagros (6 April 2000). «Elisa Lerner, una atleta de la soledad» (spanish). Análitica Venezuela Magazine 
Biography of Elisa Lerner for her novel De muerte Lenta (Fundación Bigott/Equinoccio, 2006)
Elisa Lerner: de una soledad a otra - Lo afirmativo venezolano (spanish)

1932 births
People from Valencia, Venezuela
Jewish dramatists and playwrights
Venezuelan Jews
Venezuelan women writers
Venezuelan dramatists and playwrights
Central University of Venezuela alumni
Living people
Jewish women writers